Drift is a 2013 Australian film about the birth of the surf industry in the 1970s. It was shot in Western Australia and co-directed by Morgan O'Neill and Ben Nott. It stars Sam Worthington, Xavier Samuel, and Myles Pollard, and is based on several true stories from the era.

Plot
In the late 1960s, two young brothers in Sydney escape a violent household with their mother Kat by stealing the family car as her partner sleeps. They cross the continent with the intention of hiding out and making a new start in distant Albany, Western Australia. 

Arriving south of Perth on the West Coast, they spot a perfect surf break and convince Kat to settle instead in a caravan park in Seacliffe, and the kids attend a local school while their mother does piecework as a seamstress. 

Years later, in 1972, they are young adults, living with their mum in a run-down house she bought by the beach. Older brother Andy works in a timber mill: surf prodigy Jimmy wins the 1972 Seacliffe Amateur surf title - but away from the surf, he is listless and involved in petty crime.

Determined to escape their lack of prospects, headstrong Andy and his brother form a volatile alliance. Andy sees a gap in the market and fashions custom-made wetsuits sewed by Kat, and new short surfboards in their backyard garage, eventually attracting some sales, although they are refused a bank loan to develop the business.

JB, an infamous itinerant surf filmmaker, and Lani, his Hawaiian companion, drive into town in a converted school bus towing a Mini Moke. The brothers start a business called Drift, and their troubles with a drug-dealing biker gang begin to escalate. 

JB embodies the era's anti-establishment vibe and is skeptical of Andy's interest in expanding his business, but soon realizes if the brothers can survive and stay true to their surfing roots, they might be part of something greater. 

The fledgling business generates a powerful buzz amongst the hard-core local surfers, but shooting publicity shots, as Jimmy is towed onto a huge wave at a surf break called "the Morgue", causes tensions as their boat capsizes and JB's expensive waterproof camera is lost.

The brothers’ progressive ideas further annoy the conservative locals and particularly the police, and they also find themselves embroiled in a violent feud with the bikers. The gang leader Miller uses a heroin-addicted surfer, Gus, to import kilos of heroin concealed in an order of surfboard blanks to the Drift surf shop. 

But the drugs are discovered by the brothers and flushed away by Andy, imperiling their and Gus's lives when the gang discovers they have no product and a large debt to suppliers. Gus, after trying to quit drugs, commits suicide by paddling out into the surf. Andy's growing relationship with Lani causes some friction between the brothers and with JB.

The town host a pro surf competition, which Andy enters with the intention of using the prize money to pay the bikers back. But Jimmy, a better surfer, returns from a period of introspection where he was also hiding out from the gang in fear for his life, replacing his brother. 

Jimmy gets to the competition final with a Hawaiian pro. In the last 60 seconds Jimmy, who is losing points, catches a huge wave, surfs a long barrel, and is photographed by JB (who has located and fixed his camera) doing a hands-off aerial. He wipes out, is injured underwater on the reef and rescued by Andy, and loses the competition. 

Without any money to pay the bikers, Kay agrees to sell the family house to the bank manager for a low price. The brothers drive to the surf shop and discover it is packed with customers, looked after by Lani. The reason is JB's photo is on the front page of the local newspaper, with the headline 'The future of surfing'. With money suddenly rolling in, Andy rips up and burns the house sale deed in front of the banker. 

Jimmy is invited to join the world pro surf tour. He reluctantly agrees to go and discover the world, encouraged by JB, who lets slip that Miller, the leader of the biker gang has been arrested - JB secretly planted Indonesian hash in his house and tipped off the police. Andy, Lani, and Kat wave as JB starts his bus and drives out of town to unknown future surf breaks.

Cast

 Xavier Samuel as Jimmy
 Myles Pollard as Andy
 Sam Worthington as JB
 Lesley-Ann Brandt as Lani
 Robyn Malcolm as Kat
 Maurie Ogden as Percy
 Aaron Glenane as Gus
 Sean Keenan as young Andy

Production
Tim Duffy wrote an early script in 2007. Myles Pollard became attached as actor and producer and asked Sam Worthington, with whom he had attended Drama School, to star. Worthington expressed interest but at the time was unable to commit given his international film schedule. Morgan O'Neill wrote the screenplay and came on board as co-director with Ben Nott. Worthington became available and agreed to play a support role and funding was obtained from Screen Australia, Screen West, Screen NSW, Tourism WA and Fulcrum Media Finance. Shooting took 31 days in August–September 2011 in south west Western Australia.

Box office
The film was released in Australia in early 2013. On its opening weekend it earned $268,570 at the box office making an average of $1,918 across 140 screens.

Film festivals
 Official selection Hamptons Film Festival 2013
 Official selection Newport Beach Film Festival 2013
 Official selection Maui International Film Festival 2013
 Official selection Rincon International Film Festival 2013

Awards

Critical response

On review aggregator Rotten Tomatoes, the film holds an approval rating of 32% based on 19 reviews, with an average rating of 4.65/10. On Metacritic, the film has a weighted average score of 35 out of 100, based on 10 critics, indicating "generally unfavorable reviews".

Australian critical response was generally positive:
"An entertaining ride with startling cinematography" - Roger Moore, McClatchy - Tribune News Service.
"Four Stars" - David & Margaret At The Movies. ABC1.
"I had a ball. It's funny and truthful... and the surfing takes your breath away" - Paul Byrnes, The Sydney Morning Herald.
"Great story, great cast... 5 stars... Best Aussie film since The Castle" - Jason Davis, Weekend Sunrise Seven Network.
"Pollard and Samuel are excellent" - David Stratton, The Australian.
"O’Neill’s story of innovation against the odds and young manhood continually surprises and engages" - Daniel Murphy, Empire
"Four Stars" - The Australian.
"Exquisitely shot and warmly crafted" - Erin Free, FilmInk.
"Thrilling... dramatically compelling" - Nick Dent, Time Out Sydney.
"The best surfing I've seen in a feature film" - Stu Nettle, Swellnet.
"Drift is that rare thing: an Australian surf film with not just spectacular wave action but an engaging story" - Garry Maddox, Sydney Morning Herald.

An SBS movie review criticised the last few minutes: "The pacing stumbles slightly in the third act, when the bikie/drug-running subplot collides with the surf-contest/familial tension story; there is a sense that in trying to honour both strands, the film pushed out its running time unduly. There is also a coda-like wrap-up involving JB that feels like it may have been the quickest way to tie up loose ends."

References

External links
 
 
 Review at The Australian
 Drift at Hopscotch Films
 Drift at At the Movies
 Review at Sydney Morning Herald
 Review at Filmink
 Article at Sydney Morning Herald
 Review at Time Out

Films directed by Morgan O'Neill
2013 films
Films set in Western Australia
Australian surfing films
Films scored by Michael Yezerski
2010s English-language films